Stormfront may refer to:

A weather front
Stormfront (website), a white nationalist, white supremacist and neo-Nazi Internet message forum; notable for being the first major hate website
Stormfront Studios, a video game developer
Stormfront, a set from the Pokémon Trading Card Game
Stormfront (character), a character from comic book series The Boys, by Garth Ennis

See also
Storm Front (disambiguation)